On 5 April 2014, an Australian Senate special election in Western Australia was held.  The special election was held six months after the 2013 Australian federal election.  The result of that 2013 election for the Australian Senate in Western Australia was voided on 20 February 2014 by the High Court of Australia, sitting as the Court of Disputed Returns, because 1,375 ballot papers were lost during an official recount in November 2013. The High Court ruled that because the number of lost ballots exceeded the margin for the two remaining Senate seats, the only acceptable remedy was to void the results and hold a special election.

Following the election on 5 April, preferences were distributed on 29 April 2014 according to the group voting ticket voting system used at that time. The outcome was 3 senators from the Liberal Party of Australia, 1 from the Australian Labor Party, 1 from the Australia Greens and 1 from the Palmer United Party. Compared to the November 2013 result, the Australian Sports Party's Wayne Dropulich was replaced by Dio Wang of the Palmer United Party.

The election is unprecedented in Australian federal politics. An election was held in South Australia in 1907 for the election of one senator under a previous electoral system. Half-Senate elections without a corresponding Australian House of Representatives election have occurred several times due to effluxion of time, the last one in 1970.

The date was set by Sir Peter Cosgrove, the Governor-General of Australia, on the advice of Prime Minister Tony Abbott.  However, the onus for setting times and processes fell on the Governor of Western Australia, Malcolm McCusker, on the advice of Colin Barnett, Premier of Western Australia, in McCusker's obligations under the operation of the Election of Senators Act 1903 (WA).

Result

Summary